Shera Lorraine Marie Bechard (born 14 September 1983 in Kapuskasing, Ontario) is a Canadian model who was voted Playboy's Playmate of the Month for November 2010. She also appears sporadically as an actress.

Biography
Bechard was born in Canada and grew up in Kapuskasing. At the age of 18, Bechard moved to Toronto to pursue a career as a model.

In her years as a model, she worked with people like Marcus Klinko, George Whiteside, Ian Cuttler and rock singer and photographer Bryan Adams. She also worked with director Andrew Thomas Hunt, who chose her in the lead role Karma in his 2009 film Sweet Karma.

In 2011, she was the partner of Playboy founder Hugh Hefner.

The Wall Street Journal reported in April 2018 that Bechard was having an affair with Republican fundraiser Elliott Broidy. After becoming pregnant with Broidy in late 2017, Bechard had an abortion. Her lawyer, Keith Davidson, negotiated the payment of US$1.6 million as money for silence through Michael Cohen, U.S. President Donald Trump's lawyer at that time. On July 6, 2018, Bechard filed a lawsuit against Broidy, Davidson and Michael Avenatti in California, alleging that Broidy had stopped paying the rest of the money for her silence.

See also
List of Playboy Playmates of the Month

References

External links
 

1983 births
Canadian film actresses
Canadian female models
Canadian emigrants to the United States
Living people